"We shall fight on the beaches" is a common title given to a speech delivered by the British Prime Minister Winston Churchill to the House of Commons of the Parliament of the United Kingdom on 4 June 1940. This was the second of three major speeches given around the period of the Battle of France; the others are the "Blood, toil, tears and sweat" speech of 13 May 1940, and the "This was their finest hour" speech of 18 June 1940. Events developed dramatically over the five-week period, and although broadly similar in themes, each speech addressed a different military and diplomatic context.

In this speech, Churchill had to describe a great military disaster, and warn of a possible invasion attempt by Nazi Germany, without casting doubt on eventual victory. He also had to prepare his domestic audience for France's falling out of the war without in any way releasing France to do so, and wished to reiterate a policy and an aim unchangeddespite the intervening eventsfrom his speech of 13 May, in which he had declared the goal of "victory, however long and hard the road may be".

Background 
Winston Churchill took over as Prime Minister on 10 May 1940, eight months after the outbreak of World War II in Europe. He had done so as the head of a multiparty coalition government, which had replaced the previous government (led by Neville Chamberlain) as a result of dissatisfaction with the conduct of the war, demonstrated by the Norway debate on the Allied evacuation of Southern Norway.

Coincidentally, the German Wehrmacht offensive in the Low Countries and France had begun on 10 May with the invasion of the Netherlands, Belgium and Luxembourg. Churchill had spoken to the House of Commons as Prime Minister for the first time on 13 May, to announce the formation of the new administration:

In that speech, he mentioned nothing about the military situation in France and the Low Countries.

Expecting that the German offensive would develop along much the same lines as it did in 1914, the lines of communication of the British Expeditionary Force (BEF) did not run through the "short crossing" Channel portsBoulogne, Calais, Dunkirk, etc.but rather through Dieppe and Le Havre. On 13 May, the Wehrmacht's attack through the Ardennes had reached the Meuse River at Sedan and then crossed it, breaking through the defences of the French Army. By 20 May, Wehrmacht armoured divisions had reached the coast of the English Channel, splitting the BEF and the French First Army from the main French forces.

The Wehrmacht next moved against the cut-off Allied forces, moving along the seacoast with only small Allied forces to resist them. After the capitulation of Belgium on 28 May, a gap had also appeared on the eastern flank of the Allied forces, which had been forced to retreat into a small pocket around the seaport of Dunkirk. From this pocket the bulk of the BEF and a considerable number of French troops had been evacuated in Operation Dynamo, but these troops had left behind virtually all of their heavy equipment (transport, tanks, artillery and ammunition). The French First Army had most of its units pocketed around Lille. Those of its units evacuated from Dunkirk were relanded in France, but saw no further action; they were still being reorganised in Brittany at the fall of France.

Churchill had made a brief statement to the Commons on 28 May reporting the Belgian capitulation, and concluding: 

He had promised a further statement of the military situation on 4 June, and indeed the major part of the speech is an account of military eventsso far as they affected the BEFsince the German breakthrough at Sedan.

The German breakthrough had not been exploited southwards, and the French had improvised a relatively thinly held defensive line along the Aisne and the Somme. The British military evaluation was that this was unlikely to withstand any major attack by the Wehrmacht. In the air, the French were short of fighter planes, and the shortage was worsening due to their many losses in combat. The French military commanders had hence asked for additional British fighter squadrons to be sent into the fight in France. Politically, there were considerable doubts over the French willingness to continue the war, even in the absence of any further military catastrophes. Churchill had argued in favour of sending the fighter squadrons to France because he considered that that move would be vital to sustain French public morale, and also to give no excuse for the collapse of the French Army. That would possibly lead to a French government that would not only drop out of the war, but also become hostile to the United Kingdom. The British War Cabinet discussed this issue at meetings on 3 June and on the morning of 4 June, but it decided to take the advice of the Royal Air Force and the Secretary of State for Air, Sir Archibald Sinclair, that the British priority must be to prepare its own defences. The three squadrons present in France would be kept up to fighting strength, but no further squadrons could be spared for the Battle of France.

Despite relief that the bulk of the BEF had made it back to Britain, Mass-Observation reported civilian morale in many areas as zero, one observer claiming that everyone looked suicidal. Only half the population expected Britain to fight on, and the feelings of thousands were summed up as: 

Therefore, when talking about the future course and conduct of the war in this speech, Churchill had to describe a great military disaster, and warn of a possible German invasion attempt, without casting doubt on eventual victory. He needed to prepare his domestic audience for France's departure from the war without in any way releasing France to do so. In his subsequent speech of 18 June, immediately after the French had sued for peace, Churchill said:

Finally, he needed to reiterate a policy and an aim unchangeddespite the intervening eventsfrom his speech of 13 May, in which he had said:

Possible Inspiration
S.L.A. Marshall commented that the speech may have partially been inspired by General Ferdinand Foch at the Doullens Conference, who reportedly asked Douglas Haig:

Peroration

The peroration is widely held to be one of the finest oratorical moments of the war and of Churchill's career.

It is often said that in the sentence that begins "We shall fight on the beaches" and ends in "surrender", only the last word – "surrender" – does not have Old English roots.

Reception
It is said that immediately after giving the speech, Churchill muttered to a colleague, "And we’ll fight them with the butt ends of broken beer bottles because that's bloody well all we've got!". Nonetheless, Churchill impressed his listeners and the speech was immediately recognised to be historic. Jock Colville, one of Churchill's secretaries, noted in his diary "A magnificent oration, which obviously moved the House". Chips Channon, a Conservative MP, wrote in his diary "he was eloquent and oratorical and used magnificent English; several Labour members cried". A Labour MP, Josiah Wedgwood, friend and admirer of Churchill since the Dardanelles campaign, wrote to him, "My dear Winston. That was worth 1,000 guns and the speeches of 1,000 years".

Unlike his subsequent This was their finest hour speech, Churchill's 4 June speech in the House of Commons was not repeated by him as a live radio broadcast that evening. Rather, as with his earlier Blood, toil, tears and sweat speech, extracts were read by the newsreader on that evening's BBC news broadcast. They made a great impression on Vita Sackville-West:

The next year American journalist H. R. Knickerbocker wrote that its words "deserve to be memorized by us all", observing that "With Churchill's picture these words are placarded in homes and offices throughout the British Empire."

No audio record was made at the time of the original speech; Churchill only produced an audio recording in 1949, by repeating his previous oration. Despite this, many people after the war misremembered that they had heard Churchill speaking on the radio in 1940 when all there had been were BBC news reports that quoted his words. In 1984, English heavy metal band Iron Maiden mixed a section of this recording at the beginning of the video for their song "Aces High", which is inspired by the Battle of Britain, also using the recording as the introduction to the song when performed on stage, Iron Maiden also use this section as a beginning for many live shows namely during their 1984 World Slavery Tour. In Fool's Overture, the closing track of Supertramp's 1977 album Even in the Quietest Moments..., some excerpts of the speech are heard along with London's Big Ben chiming.

See also
 Churchill war ministry
 Timeline of the United Kingdom home front during World War II

References

Further reading
 Maguire, Lori. "'We Shall Fight': A Rhetorical Analysis of Churchill's Famous Speech." Rhetoric & Public Affairs 17.2 (2014): 255–286.

External links

 A full audio recording, hosted by The Guardian.
 The Churchill Centre: We Shall Fight on the Beaches, with a short introduction
 Transcription and MP3 recording of the speech
 Hansard transcription and ensuing exchanges

1940 in the United Kingdom
World War II speeches
English phrases
British political phrases
Quotations from military
Speeches by Winston Churchill
June 1940 events
1940 speeches
1940 in politics
1940s neologisms